Erika Leitner was an Italian luger who competed in the late 1950s and early 1960s. She won the bronze medal in the women's singles at the 1960 FIL World Luge Championships in Garmisch-Partenkirchen, West Germany.

Leitner also won a bronze medal in the women's singles event at the 1955 European luge championships in Hahnenklee, West Germany.

References 
Hickok sports information on World champions in luge and skeleton.
List of European luge champions 
SportQuick.com information on World champions in luge 

Italian lugers
Italian female lugers
Possibly living people
Year of birth missing
Sportspeople from Südtirol